The Royal Manchester College of Music (RMCM) was a  tertiary level conservatoire in Manchester, north-west England. It was founded in 1893 by the German-born  conductor Sir Charles Hallé in 1893.

In 1972, the Royal Manchester College of Music amalgamated with the Northern School of Music to form the Royal Northern College of Music.

History

The Royal Manchester College of Music was founded in 1893 by Sir Charles Hallé who assumed the role as Principal. For a long period of time Hallé had argued for Manchester's need for a conservatoire to properly train the local talent.

The RMCM opened in 1893 in a former club building on the corner of Ducie Grove and Ducie Street, near Oxford Road. The building was adapted for use as a college by the architects Salomons and Steinthal, and contained a 400-seat concert hall lined with walnut wood panelling, classrooms, a library and offices. According to the Manchester Guardian, instead of a formal opening ceremony, donors were invited to a conversazione with Sir Charles Hallé and other musicians on Saturday October 7, 1893. Students were admitted in October 1893.

In 1888 German violinist Willy Hess became leader of The Hallé Orchestra, a role he held until 1895. From its opening in 1893 he was also the principal professor of violin at the Royal Manchester College of Music.

In 1954 the Principal of the RMCM, Frederic Cox, started to explore the issue of amalgamation with the Northern School of Music. This took until 1972 when the amalgamation resulted in the founding of the Royal Northern College of Music.

Principals 
 Sir Charles Hallé (1891-5)
 Adolph Brodsky (1896-1929)
 Robert Jaffrey Forbes (1929-1953)
 Frederic Cox (1953-1970)

Notable teachers
 John Acton, voice
 Wilhelm Backhaus, piano
 Rawdon Briggs, violin
 Walter Carroll, composition
 Marie Fillunger, voice
 Carl Fuchs
 Henry Hiles
 Helen Lemmens-Sherrington, voice
 Frank Merrick, piano
 Olga Neruda, piano
 James Kendrick Pyne, organ
 Simon Speelman, violin
Hope Squire, piano

Notable alumni

Harrison Birtwistle, composer
Arthur Butterworth, composer
Pamela Bowden, contralto and voice teacher
Louis Cohen, violinist and conductor
Peter Maxwell Davies, composer
Alexander Goehr, composer
Barry Griffiths, violinist
Jeffrey Lawton, tenor
Martin Milner, violinist
John Ogdon, piano
Alan Rawsthorne, composer
Maisie Ringham, trombonist
Barbara Robotham, opera singer and voice teacher
Carolyn Watkinson, opera singer
 John Ramsden Williamson, composer
 Carol Jane Seymour, Accompanist.
 Olive Zorian (191665), violinist

References

Other sources 

 Royal Manchester College of Music Archive: National Archives

Music schools in England
Royal colleges
Education in Manchester
Educational institutions established in 1893
1893 establishments in England
Defunct universities and colleges in England
Royal Northern College of Music